The Korea Football Association is the governing body of football and futsal within South Korea. It sanctions professional, semi-professional and amateur football in South Korea. Founded in 1933, the governing body became affiliated with FIFA twenty years later in 1948, and the Asian Football Confederation in 1954.

History
In 1921, the first All Joseon Football Tournament was held, and in 1933, the Korea Football Association was organized (following the foundation of Joseon Referees' Association in 1928), which created a foundation to disseminate and develop the sport. Park Seung-bin was the first president of the KFA, charged with the task of promoting and spreading organised football in Korea.

The Korea Football Association was reinstated in 1948, following the establishment of the Republic of Korea. The KFA became a member of FIFA, the international football governing body that same year. It later joined the AFC (Asian Football Confederation) in 1954.

On 23 January 2013, KFA elected Chung Mong-gyu as the new chairman.

Members

Board
President: Chung Mong-gyu 
Vice-presidents: Kim Ki-hong, Cho Byung-deuk, Choi Young-il, Lee Seok-jae, Lee Young-pyo, Hong Eun-ah, Lee Dong-gook
Executive director: Park Kyung-hoon
Directors: Kim Ho-kon, Park Gi-chan, Han Sang-sin, Yang Seung-woon, Park Gong-won, Choi Kwang-won, Jo Yeon-sang, Jung Jae-kwon, Park Kun-ha, Park Chae-hee, Kim Jin-hee, Shin A-young
General secretary: Chun Han-jin
Treasurers: Lee Tae-ho, Baek Dong-hyun
Administrative inspector: Son Ho-young

Heads of departments
Competition committee: Jung Hae-seong
Technical committee: Lee Lim-saeng
Reinforcement committee: Michael Müller
Referee committee: Kim Dong-jin
Duty committee: Seo Dong-won
Fairness committee: Seo Chang-hee
Ethics committee: Yoo Dae-woo
Social committee: Cho Won-hee

Other officers
Media and communication manager: Kim Yong-joo
Men's team coach: Jürgen Klinsmann
Women's team coach: Colin Bell
Futsal coordinator: Moon Chae-hyeun

Presidents
Shin Ki-jun was the president of the Joseon Referees' Association, but he is not officially recognised as the first president.

National teams
Source:

Men's teams
South Korea national football team
South Korea national under-23 football team
South Korea national under-20 football team
South Korea national under-17 football team
South Korea national under-14 football team
South Korea Universiade football team
South Korea national futsal team

Women's teams
South Korea women's national football team
South Korea women's national under-20 football team
South Korea women's national under-17 football team
South Korea women's national under-14 football team
South Korea women's Universiade football team

Defunct team
South Korea national beach soccer team

Competitions

Current competitions

Defunct competitions
 All Joseon Football Tournament: National cup held from 1938 to 1940. (1921–1937 editions were held by Joseon Sports Council.)
 Korean National Football Championship: National cup held from 1946 to 2000.
 Korean President's Cup: Cup competition contested between semi-professional and amateur clubs from 1952 to 2009.
 Korea Cup: International competition annually held from 1971 to 1999.
 K League: Professional league held from 1983 to 1994. (Subsequent seasons were held by K League Federation.)

Awards

Current awards
Player of the Year
Young Player of the Year
Coach of the Year
Goal of the Year
Referee of the Year
Club of the Year

Defunct awards
Best XI
Hall of Fame

See also
 South Korea national football team
 K League
 Football in South Korea

References

External links
 Korea Football Association (KFA) – official website 
 KFA at FIFA.com
 KFA at AFC site

Korea Football Association